Alagoas is one of the 27 federative units of Brazil and is situated in the eastern part of the Northeast Region. It borders: Pernambuco (N and NW); Sergipe (S); Bahia (SW); and the Atlantic Ocean (E). Its capital is the city of Maceió. It has 1.6% of the Brazilian population and produces 0.8% of the Brazilian GDP. It is made up of 102 municipalities and its most populous cities are Maceió, Arapiraca, Palmeira dos Índios, Rio Largo, Penedo, União dos Palmares, São Miguel dos Campos, Santana do Ipanema, Delmiro Gouveia, Coruripe, Marechal Deodoro, and Campo Alegre.

It is the second smallest Brazilian state in area (larger only than Sergipe) and it is 16th in population. It is also one of the largest producers of sugarcane and coconuts in the country, and has an economy based on cattle raising.

Land of the sururu (or Charru Mussel), lagoon shellfish which serves as food for the coastal population, and of coconut water, Alagoas also possesses some of the country's richest folklore.

Initially, the territory of Alagoas constituted the southern part of the Captaincy of Pernambuco and only gained its autonomy in 1817. Its occupation pushed the expansion of the captaincy's sugarcane farming, which required new areas of cultivation, southward. Thus arose Porto Calvo, Alagoas (now Marechal Deodoro) and Penedo, nuclei which guided the colonization, economic, and social life of the region for a long time.

The Dutch invasion in Pernambuco was extended to Alagoas in 1631. The invaders were expelled in 1645, after intense fighting in Porto Calvo, leaving the economy in ruins.

The escape of African slaves during the Dutch invasion created a serious labour shortage problem on the sugarcane plantations. Grouped in villages called quilombos, the Africans were only completely dominated at the end of the 17th century with the destruction of the most important quilombo, Palmares.

During the empire, the separatist and republican Confederation of the Equator received the support of noteworthy figures from Alagoas. Throughout the 1840s, political life was marked by the conflict between the lisos (lit. "straights", not the sexual orientation connotation), conservatives, and the cabeludos (lit. "hairies"), liberals.

At the beginning of the 20th century, the region's hinterland lived through the pioneering experience of Delmiro Gouveia, a entrepreneur from Pernambuco who installed the Estrela thread factory, which came to produce 200 spools daily. Delmiro Gouveia was killed in October 1917 in circumstances still unclarified, after being pressured, according to rumor, to sell his factory to competing foreign firms. After his death, his machines would be destroyed and thrown into Paulo Afonso Falls.

Nicknamed the Land of the Marshals (Terra dos Marechais), for being the birthplace of Deodoro da Fonseca and Floriano Peixoto, the first two presidents of Brazil, Alagoas gave the country numerous illustrious Brazilians among whom are the anthropologist Arthur Ramos, the maestro Hekel Tavares, the philologist Aurélio Buarque de Holanda, the musicians Djavan and Hermeto Pascoal the poet Jorge de Lima, the jurists Pontes de Miranda and Marcos Bernardes de Mello, besides the writers Lêdo Ivo and Graciliano Ramos.

Etymology
The Latin lacus, "reservoir, lake" is the origin, in the primitive vocabulary heritage, of the Portuguese, Spanish, and Italian lago, French lac, one of its derivatives, the Latin lacuna, "pitfall, hole", "lack, want, neglect", explains the Spanish and Italian laguna. But the Portuguese lagoa, coincidentally with the Spanish lagona and Mirandese llagona, suggests a change in suffix, already documented in a 938 document from Valencia, under the spelling lacona, and in another from 1094, in Sahagún, under the spelling lagona. 

The Portuguese lagoa under the spelling lagona (perhaps lagõna), is documented in the 14th century, and alternated with the other for a long time; the prosthesis is then explained by the introduction of the article, chiefly in locution (na lagoa, vindo da lagoa) (in the lake, coming from the lake), and for morphologic regularization with the derivatives of the verb alagar (to inundate) (alagadiço, alagado, alagador, alagamento, etc.) (swampish, waterlogged, flooding, overflow, etc.).

The name appears as a competitor with the names of the lagoons of Manguaba, a lagoa do sul ("the southern lagoon"), and Mundaú, a lagoa do norte ("the northern lagoon"), already in the 16th century, when settlements were founded near the Alagoa do Norte and the Alagoa do Sul, the Alagoas, with the inclusion of the rest of the lagoons in the area.

The suffix -ano is characteristic of Brazil: paraibano, pernambucano, alagoano, sergipano, baiano, goiano, and later acriano.

Geography

The state's name originates with the lakes along its coast near the city of Maceió. The coast is bordered by fringing reefs and many fine beaches. Behind the beaches, sometimes only hundreds of meters and defined by steep scarps, lies a stretch of green coastal hills having enough rainfall for considerable agriculture and scarce remnants of the Atlantic Forest that now is largely limited to steep hill tops or steep valley sides and bottoms. This is the area long dominated by sugar cane.

Still farther inland lies the Sertão of the Northeast region of the nation. The Sertão is a high dry region dominated by scrub that is often thorn-filled and sometimes toxic, the caatinga. This area and its people are famed in legend and song. It is the land of the cowboy who is clad from head to toe (if he is lucky) with very thick leather to avoid the sharp vegetation.

History

During the first three centuries of its history, Alagoas was part of the captaincy of Pernambuco, only becoming an independent captaincy in 1817.  As a reprisal against the Pernambuco Revolution, the King John VI of Portugal ordered a vast portion of the territory of Pernambuco to be taken from it, most including its southern portion, one part was given to the captaincy of Bahia, the other portion was made independent, creating Alagoas as a new Brazilian captaincy.

Initially, in the first years of the 16th century, Alagoas settlement went on slowly, however helped by Africans turned into slaves whose work urged the local economy. In the period of the 16th and 17th centuries, French pirates invaded its territory attracted by the commerce of brazilwood.

Some time later, Duarte Coelho, owner of the captaincy of Pernambuco, gave the control of the region back to the Portuguese, running the territory as part of his captaincy. He increased the number of sugar cane plantations and built some sugar mills, as well as founding the cities of Penedo and Alagoas – this last one originally baptized by Portuguese as Santa Maria Madalena da Alagoa do Sul (Saint Mary Magdalene of the Southern Lake), currently the historic heritage town of Deodoro da Fonseca.

In 1570, a second expedition ordered by Duarte Coelho and led by Cristóvão Lins, explored the north of Alagoas and founded the settlement of Porto Calvo and five sugar mills, which two of them still endure, Buenos Aires and Escurial.

In 1630, the territory was taken by the Dutch, whose interest was to manage the commerce of sugarcane in most parts of the northeastern region of Brazil. As part of one of the wealthiest Brazilian captaincies, Alagoas prospered along with the sugar trade. They built Fort Maurits in Penedo, on the river São Francisco. However, the Dutch colonizers abandoned the territory after being defeated in 1646.

Decades before Alagoas was formed in 1817, its sugar industry had 200 mills, and agriculture also involved cotton, tobacco and corn plantations. With Brazilian independence from Portugal in 1822, Alagoas became a province. In 1839, the capital of the province was changed definitively from the town of Alagoas to Maceió, mainly due to the increasing growth of the city because of its port.

Demographics

According to the IBGE of 2008, there were 3,173,000 people residing in the state. The population density was 109.9 inhabitants/km2.

Urbanization: 67.4% (2006); Population growth: 1.3% (1991–2000); Houses: 779,000 (2006).

The last PNAD (National Research for Sample of Domiciles) census revealed the following numbers:  2,100,000 Brown (Multiracial) people (66.18%), 964,000 White people (30.39%), 96,000 Black people (3.02%), 11,000 Asian people (0.35%).

According to a genetic study from 2013, Brazilians in Alagoas have 53.7% European, 26.6% African and 18.7% Amerindian ancestries, respectively.

Largest cities

Statistics
Vehicles: 287,018 (March 2007)
Mobile phones: 1.4 million (April 2007)
Telephones: 302,000 (April 2007)
Cities: 102 (2007).
Homicides: 60 per 100,000 inhabitants

Education 

Portuguese is the official national language, and thus the primary language taught in schools.  But English and Spanish are part of the official high school curriculum.

Educational institutions
 Universidade Federal de Alagoas (UFAL) (Federal University of Alagoas);
 Universidade Estadual de Alagoas (Uneal) (State University of Alagoas);
 Universidade de Ciências da Saúde de Alagoas (Uncisal) (University of Sciences of the Health of Alagoas);
 Instituto Federal de Alagoas (IFAL);
 Centro de Ensino Superior de Maceió (CESMAC) (Center of Higher Education of Maceió);
 Faculdade de Alagoas (FAL) (College of Alagoas);
 and many others.

Economy

Alagoas is one of the poorest states of Brazil and its HDI is the country's worst. The service sector is the largest component of GDP at 55.8%, followed by the industrial sector at 36.9%. Agriculture represents 7.3%, of GDP (2004). Alagoas exports: sugar 58.8%, alcohol 29.4%, chemicals 9%, tobacco 2.1% (2002).

Share of the Brazilian economy: 0.7% (2004).

The economy has been agricultural, dependent largely on large sugarcane plantations with some tobacco farming that is concentrated around the city of Arapiraca. Sugar cane formed the basis for an alcohol industry that is in decline. Small to medium-sized tanker ships took alcohol on board in Maceio's port with considerable frequency during the peak period. Such loads still take place with less frequency. Another local industry is based on chemical products from brine pumped from deep wells on the outskirts of Maceió.

In the last twenty years the tourist industry has found the beaches and Maceió itself has changed from a rather sleepy little port with coconut palm plantations along its beaches to high-rise hotels. The northern coast, particularly around the towns Maragogi and Japaratinga is beginning to see some of this development in the form of resorts attracting people from the south and from Europe. There is considerable European investment (as of 2007) in beach property north of Maceió with walled compounds of beach homes.

Infrastructure

International Airport
Alagoas gained a new airport complex, Zumbi dos Palmares International Airport, in the Maceió Metropolitan Area, designed by homegrown architect Mário Aloísio, which combines glass, metal and granite. It includes space for art exhibitions, a panoramic deck, chapel, seven escalators, nine elevators and four boarding bridges. The whole terminal was designed to permit access by the physically disabled, with ramps and special bathroom fixtures.

In the new terminal, Infraero also brings to Maceió "Aeroshopping" – a concept that is transforming the country's airports into centers for leisure and high-quality products and services. The entire building has a computerized air conditioning, with commercial spaces that will be occupied gradually. The parking area was more than tripled. Demand will be able to grow to 1.2 million passengers a year since the new passenger terminal has 24,000 square meters, the triple of its former size. The check-in counters were doubled and can reach higher numbers without any structural remodeling. The building is "intelligent", meaning controlled by a computerized system that regulates factors ranging from the lighting level to air temperature and even the speed of the escalators. This system also controls access to restricted areas and the fire protection system, among others.

Highways
BR-101
BR-104
BR-110
BR-316
BR-423
BR-424

Port
The Port of Jaraguá is located in Maceió. The commercial and economic development of the Port of Jaraguá, on the margins of the Mundaú lagoon, was responsible for the emergence of an important settlement that received the name of Maceió and later became the present capital of Alagoas. The Port of Jaraguá is situated in a natural port area that facilitates the ships docking. During the colonial period, the most important products exported through the port were sugar, tobacco, coconut and spices.

Culture

Festa Junina (Saint John Festival)
Festa Junina was introduced to Northeastern Brazil by the Portuguese for whom St. John's day (also celebrated as Midsummer Day in several European countries), on 24 June, is one of the oldest and most popular celebrations of the year. Differently, of course, from what happens on the European Midsummer Day, the festivities in Brazil do not take place during the summer solstice but during the tropical winter solstice. The festivities traditionally begin after the 12th of June, on the eve of St. Anthony's day, and last until the 29th, which is Saint Peter's day. During these fifteen days, there are bonfires, fireworks, and folk dancing in the streets (step names are in French, which shows the mutual influences between court life and peasant culture in the 17th, 18th, and 19th-century Europe). Once exclusively a rural festivity, today it is largely a city festival during which people joyfully and theatrically mimic peasant stereotypes and cliches in a spirit of joke and good time. Typical dishes and drinks are served. Like during Carnival, these festivities involve costumes-wearing (in this case, peasant costumes), dancing and visual spectacles (fireworks display and folk dancing). Like what happens on Midsummer and St. John's Day in Europe, bonfires are a central part of these festivities in Brazil.

Carnival
The four-day period before Lent leading up to Ash Wednesday is carnival time in Brazil. People of diverse origins or social classes forget their cares as they party in the streets.

Warrior
This is a typical Alagoas revelry that resulted from the union of Reisado (an Epiphany celebration), Auto dos Caboclinhos (Caboclinhos’ Play), Chegança (public folk play depicting a naval battle) and Pastoril (outdoor folk play). Its captivating choreography and costumes with colored ribbons and beads reproduce the cathedral’s façades on the monumental hats covered with mirrors.

Fandango
This is a dramatic dance motivated by the sea. It tells the sea adventures of the first navigators in its songs accompanied by guitar and ukulele.

Carnival Bull
Boi do Carnaval is a popular culture display derived from Bumba-Meu-Boi. It is always presented together with La Ursa (The Bear), Vaqueiro (Cowboy) and a percussion band whose rhythms captivate all who hear them.

Sports

Alagoas provides visitors and residents with various sport activities. There are several football clubs based in the state, such as ASA de Arapiraca, CRB, CSA, Murici, Coruripe, CSE, Santa Rita, Penedense and Ipanema.

Maceió was one of the 18 candidates to host games of the 2014 FIFA World Cup, for which Brazil is the selected host, but it did not make the final cut.

Notable people
Aurélio Buarque de Holanda Ferreira -  Lexicographer, philologist, translator, and writer
Renan Calheiros - PMDB politician and president of the Senate of Brazil
Djavan - Singer/songwriter
Deodoro da Fonseca (1827-1892) - First president of Federative Republic of Brazil, 1889-1891.
Anilda Leão  (1923-2012) poet, writer, feminist, actress and singer
Marta - Women's football striker
Nise da Silveira - Psychiatrist
Hermeto Pascoal - Composer and multi-instrumentalist
Floriano Peixoto - Second President of Brazil
Graciliano Ramos - Writer
Bruna Tenório - Top Model
Mário Zagallo - Football player and manager
Jorge de Lima - Poet and writer
Roberto Firmino - Liverpool FC football player

Flag

The coat of arms symbolizes the first Alagoan settlement of Porto Calvo. Some plantations, sugarcane, and cotton that provided wealth in the past are incorporated in the design. The colors red, white, and blue refer to the French Tricolore, symbolizing the ideals of the French Revolution (liberté, égalité, fraternité), while the five-pointed star refers to the coat of arms of Brazil.

References

External links

 Official Website
 Brazilian Tourism Portal
 Visit Alagoas
 Guide of Alagoas
 Ministry of Transport port data including main products exported
 Brazilian Embassy in London: São Francisco River

 
States of Brazil

States and territories established in 1817
1817 establishments in Brazil